Bryan Smyth is a rugby league footballer who played in the 1990s.

International honours
Smyth won three caps for Ireland while at Illingworth in 1995.

References

Living people
English people of Irish descent
English rugby league players
Ireland national rugby league team players
Place of birth missing (living people)
Rugby league props
Year of birth missing (living people)